The 2014 Much Music Video Awards (MMVAs) was held on June 15, 2014 outside the Much headquarters in downtown Toronto. Kendall Jenner and Kylie Jenner served as co-hosts for the show.

The ceremony, which marked the 25th edition of the MMVAs, was simulcast live on Much and CTV.

Winners and nominees 
(winners in bold)
Video of the Year

 Arcade Fire - "Afterlife"
 Drake - "Worst Behavior"
 Hedley - "Anything"
 SonReal - "Everywhere We Go"
 The Weeknd ft. Drake - "Live For"

Post-Production of the Year

 City and Colour - "Thirst"
 Hedley - "Crazy For You"
 Sam Roberts Band - "We're All in This Together"
 Serena Ryder- "What I Wouldn't Do"
 Tokyo Police Club - "Hot Tonight"

Dance Video of the Year

 A Tribe Called Red ft. Northern Voice - "Sisters"
 Autoerotique - "Asphyxiation"
 Chromeo ft. Toro Y Moi - "Come Alive"
 Keys N Krates - "Dum Dee Dum"
 Thugli - "Run This"

Director of the Year

 Arcade Fire - "Afterlife" Director: Emily Kai Bock
 Drake - "Worst Behavior" Directors: Director X & Drake
 Hedley - "Anything" Director: John JP Poliquin
 SonReal - "Everywhere We Go" Director: Peter Huang
 Thugli - "Run This" Directors: Amos LeBlanc & Ohji Inoue

Pop Video of the Year

 Down With Webster - "Chills"
 Hedley - "Anything"
 Mia Martina f. Dev - "La La/Danse"
 Serena Ryder- "What I Wouldn't Do"
 Tegan and Sara - "Goodbye, Goodbye"

Rock/Alternative Video of the Year

 Arcade Fire - "Reflektor"
 City and Colour - "Thirst"
 July Talk - "Guns + Ammunition"
 Sam Roberts Band - "Shapeshifters"
 Tokyo Police Club - "Hot Tonight"

Hip Hop Video of the Year

 Classified ft. B.o.B - "Higher"
 Drake - "Worst Behavior"
 D-Sisive - "Friend of Mine"
 P. Reign ft. A$AP Rocky - "We Them"
 SonReal - "Everywhere We Go"

MuchFact Video of the Year

 Autoerotique - Asphyxiation"
 Sam Roberts Band - "Shapeshifters"
 SonReal - "Everywhere We Go"
 Thugli - "Run This"
 Victoria Duffield - "More Than Friends"

International Video of the Year – Artist

 Avicii ft. Aloe Blacc - "Wake Me Up"
 Beyoncé ft. Jay-Z - "Drunk in Love"
 Iggy Azalea ft. Charli XCX - "Fancy"
 Kanye West - "Bound 2"
 Katy Perry ft. Juicy J - "Dark Horse"
 Lorde - "Royals"
 Miley Cyrus - "Wrecking Ball"
 Pharrell - "Happy"
 Selena Gomez - "Come and Get It"
 Taylor Swift ft. Ed Sheeran - "Everything Has Changed"

International Video of the Year – Group

 5 Seconds of Summer - "She Looks So Perfect"
 Daft Punk ft. Pharrell Williams - "Lose Yourself to Dance"
 Disclosure ft. Sam Smith - "Latch"
 Foster the People - "Coming of Age"
 Imagine Dragons - Demons"
 Kings of Leon - "Supersoaker"
 Macklemore & Ryan Lewis ft. ScHoolboy Q & Hollis - "White Walls"
 Maroon 5 - "Love Somebody"
 Mumford & Sons - "Hopeless Wanderer"
 One Direction - "Story of My Life"

International Video of the Year by a Canadian

 Avril Lavigne - "Rock N Roll"
 Drake ft. Majid Jordan - "Hold On, We're Going Home"
 Justin Bieber - "All That Matters"
 MAGIC! - "Rude"
 The Weeknd - "Belong to the World"

Your Fave Video

 Arcade Fire - "Reflektor"
 Drake - "Worst Behavior"
 Hedley - "Anything"
 SonReal - "Everywhere We Go"
 The Weeknd ft. Drake - "Live For"

Your Fave Artist/Group

 Avril Lavigne
 Drake
 Hedley
 Justin Bieber
 The Weeknd

Your Fave International Artist/Group

 Ariana Grande
 Katy Perry
 Lorde
 Miley Cyrus
 Selena Gomez

Performers
Acts that performed during the show include:

 Hedley - "Crazy for You"
 Ed Sheeran - "Sing"
MAGIC! - "Rude"
 Kiesza - "Hideaway"
 Lorde - "Tennis Court"/"Team" 
 Sam Roberts Band - "We're All in This Together"
 Virginia To Vegas ft. Alyssa Reid - "We Are Stars"
 Imagine Dragons - "Demons"/"Radioactive"
 Ariana Grande - "Problem"

Presenters
 Jena Malone 
 Kellan Lutz 
 Chloë Grace Moretz 
 Marianas Trench
 Mia Martina
 The Weeknd
 Victoria Duffield
 Colton Haynes 
 SonReal
 Nikki Yanofsky
 P.K. Subban
 Kiernan Shipka 
 Serena Ryder
 Laura Vandervoort 
 Arkells
 Down with Webster
 Fefe Dobson

References

External links 

MuchMusic Video Awards
Much Music
2014 in Canadian television
2014 in Canadian music